Daniel Hölzle (born 22 August 1981) is a Swiss superintendent and politician. He currently serves as a member of the Grand Council of Aargau for the Green Party of Switzerland since 2013. Hölzle previously served on the city council of Zofingen, where he was succeeded by Marija Jurisic. He currently also serves as president of the Green Party of Aargau.

Early life and education 
Hölzle was born 22 August 1981 in Liestal, Switzerland to Rolf and Irene Hölzle (née Keller).

Career 
Initially, he worked as a chemical technician for a while before he formally began to teach. His first position was at his former secondary school in Brittnau where he primarily taught physics and chemistry. He sometimes was a substitute teacher for English. Hölzle currently serves in the position of superintendent and rector of the secondary schools in Brittnau and Zofingen.

Politics 
Hölzle was elected into Grand Council of Aargau for the Green Party of Switzerland and assumed office on 30 March 2013. Between 2013 and 2018 he was a member of the public safety commission and since 2018 he serves as a member of the audit committee. Since 2021 he additionally is a member of the commission of national economy and taxation. In 2022, Hölzle became a member of the Intercantonal Legislative Conference. 

Between 2017 and 2020 he served on the city council of Zofingen.

Personal life 
Hölzle is married and has two children. He resides in Zofingen.

References 

Living people
1982 births
21st-century Swiss politicians
Green Party of Switzerland politicians
Members of Cantonal Executives of Switzerland
Swiss city councillors
People from Liestal
People from Zofingen